Andrzej Jeż (born 3 May 1963) is a Polish Roman Catholic bishop, being the bishop of the Roman Catholic Diocese of Tarnów since 2012. He was previously the auxiliary bishop of Tarnów and titular bishop of Tigillava from 2009 to 2012.

Biography

Early life
Jeż was born on 3 May 1963 in Limanowa. He attended the local high school in Limanowa, and in 1982 he passed the secondary school-leaving examination. From 1982 to 1988 Jeż studied at the Major Seminary in Tarnów, and on 12 June 1988 he was ordained priest by Jerzy Ablewicz, the diocesan bishop of Tarnów. From 1993 to 1995 he completed specialist studies in homiletics at the Academy of Catholic Theology in Warsaw, which he completed with a licentiate. Jeż would continue his studies at the Pontifical Gregorian University in Rome. In 2002 at the Faculty of Theology of the Pontifical Academy of Theology in Krakow he obtained a doctorate in dogmatic theology based on the dissertation Christus Communicator. An attempt to build a Christological model based on the theory of interpersonal communication, written under the direction of Stanisław Budzik.

Priestly ministry
He worked as a priest and victor in the parishes in Krościenko nad Dunajcem from 1988 to 1991, and in Wierzchosławice from 1991 to 1993. In 2004 Jeż became a pastor of the parish of Saint Mary, the Queen of Poland, in Tarnów. At that time, he was dean of the Tarnów deanery and became a member of the diocesan council for the formation of clergy. In 2007 Jeż was transferred to the office of priest of the parish of St. Małgorzata in Nowy Sącz. In this position he became the dean of the deanery of Nowy Sącz, he became a member of the diocesan pastoral council, and was also appointed the canon canon and provost of the collegiate chapter in Nowy Sącz.

In 1996 Jeż was appointed as a priest and professor at the Major Seminary in Tarnów, and from 1999 to 2007 he taught homiletics to seminarians of the diocese.

Ordination as bishop
On 20 October 2009, Jeż was appointed by Pope Benedict XVI as auxiliary bishop of the Diocese of Tarnów, as well as the titular bishop of Tigillava. He was ordained a bishop on 28 September 2011 in the Cathedral Basilica of the Nativity of the Blessed Virgin Mary, with the consecrator being the former bishop of Tarnów, Wiktor Paweł Skworc, with the co-consecrators cardinal Stanisław Dziwisz, archbishop of Kraków, and Józef Kowalczyk, archbishop of Gniezno. Jeż choose "Ad Laudem Trinitatis Et Deiparae" (To the praise and the Holy Trinity) as his bishops motto.

On 12 May 2012 Pope Benedict XVI appointed Jeż as the new bishop of Tarnów, succeeding the retiring Władysław Bobowski. He was officially installed as bishop in the Cathedral Basilica of the Nativity of the Blessed Virgin Mary on 15 June 2013.

Life as Bishop
In 2016 Jeż convened the fifth synod in the history of the Diocese of Tarnów to address questions facing the diocese on matters such as canon law and parish problems.

References

1963 births
Living people
People from Limanowa
21st-century Roman Catholic titular bishops
21st-century Roman Catholic bishops in Poland
Pontifical Gregorian University alumni